Parascolopsis baranesi, is a fish found in the  Gulf of Aqaba in the Western Indian Ocean. 

Etymology
The fish is named in honor of Albert (Avi) Baranes (b. 1949),the Director of the Interuniversity Institute for Marine Sciences in Eilat, Israel, who made it possible to collect this species in the Gulf of Aqaba.

References

Fish of the Indian Ocean
Taxa named by Barry C. Russell
Taxa named by Daniel Golani
Fish described in 1993
Nemipteridae